Trotsky Icepick is an American indie rock band, their name referring to Leon Trotsky and his assassination. From 1983 through 1994 the band released six albums, all on SST Records. Trotsky Icepick continues to release records into the 2020s on Poison Summer Records.  Members have included alumni from LA indie groups, The Last, Urinals (100 Flowers), Middle Class, Cockeyed Ghost and Leaving Trains.

Discography
Whispering Glades / In Exile (45)
Poison Summer (Danny & the Doorknobs) (1983), Old Scratch - reissued in 1989 as Trotsky Icepick Presents: Danny And The Doorknobs 
Poison Summer (Trotsky Icepick) (1986), SST 
Baby (1988), SST 
El Kabong (1989), SST 
The Ultraviolet Catastrophe (1991), SST 
Carpetbomb the Riff (1993), SST 
Hot Pop Hello (1994), SST 
World War X - single (2018), Poison Summer Records
I Haunted Myself (2019), Poison Summer Records
Acrylic - ep (2020), Poison Summer Records

References

External links
 
 Trotsky Icepick on Myspace

Musical groups from Los Angeles